Getargel, formerly known as Radiokayanin kits, or SMO, is a village in the Kotayk Province of Armenia. 

The Dzagavank Monastery, also known as the Surp Nshan Monastery of Getargel, is located on the village's southern outskirts. The monastery consists of two churches: the main church of Surp Nshan dating back to the 7th century, and the 13th-century two-story chapel. The monastic complex was entirely renovated between 2001 and 2004.

As of the 2011 census, the population of the village is 795. In addition to Armenians, the village has a Kurdish population.

Gallery

See also 
Kotayk Province

References 

Populated places in Kotayk Province
Kurdish settlements in Armenia